The 2021–22 season was the 76th season in the existence of TSV Hartberg and the club's fourth consecutive season in the top flight of Austrian football. In addition to the domestic league, TSV Hartberg participated in this season's edition of the Austrian Cup.

Players

First-team squad

Out on loan

Transfers

In:

Out:

Pre-season and friendlies

Competitions

Overall record

Austrian Football Bundesliga

Regular stage

Results summary

Results by round

Matches
The league fixtures were announced on 22 June 2021.

Relegation round

Results summary

Results by round

Matches

Austrian Cup

References

TSV Hartberg seasons
TSV Hartberg